Speculaas is a type of spiced shortcrust biscuit baked with speculaas spices.

Speculaas is usually flat in the shape of a picture and is especially popular around the feast of St. Nicholas and during the time of Advent. The oldest sources on speculaas also mention weddings and fairs. In recent decades, however, it has become normal to eat Speculaas all year round, especially with coffee or tea, or with ice cream.

Speculaas is mainly made and eaten in Belgium and the Netherlands, as well as in the German Westphalia and Rhineland, Luxembourg and northern France. It can also be found in Indonesia where it is known as spekulaas or spekulaaskoekjes, and usually served at Christmas or on other special occasions.

See also

Cookie butter
Ginger biscuit
Kruidnoten, a thicker, harder biscuit made without molds with the same ingredients
Springerle, a thicker, anise-flavoured, moulded Christmas biscuit from Germany

References

Almond cookies
Sinterklaas food
Biscuits
Christmas in Germany